The mixed team relay cycling event at the 2012 Summer Paralympics took place on September 8 at Brands Hatch. The event consisted of riders in classes H1-4. Seven national teams competed. The race length was 18 km.

Results
LAP=Lapped

References

Mixed road race team relay